In the Eurocode series of European standards (EN) related to construction, Eurocode 4: Design of composite steel and concrete structures (abbreviated EN 1994 or, informally, EC 4) describes how to design of composite structures, using the limit state design philosophy.  It was approved by the European Committee for Standardization (CEN) on 4 November 2004. Eurocode 4 is divided in two parts EN 1994-1 and EN 1994-2.

Eurocode 4 is intended to be used in conjunction with:

 EN 1990: Eurocode - Basis of structural design;
 EN 1991: Eurocode 1 - Actions on structures;
ENs, hENs, ETAGs and ETAs for construction products relevant for composite structures;
 EN 1090: Execution of steel structures and aluminium structures;
 EN 13670: Execution of concrete structures;
 EN 1992: Eurocode 2 - Design of concrete structures;
 EN 1993: Eurocode 3 - Design of steel structures;
 EN 1997: Eurocode 7 - Geotechnical design;
 EN 1998: Eurocode 8 - Design of structures for earthquake resistance, when composite structures are built in seismic regions.

Part 1-1: General rules and rules for buildings
EN 1994-1-1 gives a general basis for the design of composite structures together with specific rules for buildings.

Contents
  General
  Basis of design
  Materials
  Durability
  Structural analysis
  Ultimate limit states
  Serviceability limit states
  Constructional details in buildings structures
  Composite slab with steel grids for the buildings

Part 1-2: Structural fire design
EN 1994-1-2 deals with the design of composite steel and concrete structures for the accidental situation of fire exposure and is intended to be used in conjunction with EN 1994-1-1 and EN 1991-1-2.  This part only identifies differences from, or supplements to, normal temperature design and deals only with passive methods of fire protection.  Active methods are not covered.

Part 2: General rules and rules for bridges
EN 1994-2 gives design rules for steel-concrete composite bridges or members of bridges, additional to the general rules in EN 1994-1-1.  Cable stayed bridges are not fully covered by this part.

Contents
 General
 Basis of design
 Materials
 Durability
 Structural analysis
 Ultimate limit states
 Serviceability limit states
 Decks with precast concrete slabs
 Composite plates in bridges

External links
 The EN Eurocodes
 EN 1994: Design of composite steel and concrete structures
 EN 1994 - Eurocode 4: Design of composite steel and concrete structures - "Eurocodes: Background and applications" workshop

01994
Reinforced concrete
4
Structural steel